John Walpole (born by 1522 – died 1 or 2 November 1557) was an English lawyer.

Biography
He was justice of the peace for Norfolk in 1547, member of Parliament for Lynn in March and October 1553, serjeant-at-law in 1555 and recorder of Lynn and Norwich from 1556 until his death.

References

1520s births
1557 deaths
John
Serjeants-at-law (England)
English MPs 1553 (Edward VI)
English MPs 1553 (Mary I)